This is a list of records from the Port Adelaide Football Club for the club's first team since its inception in 1870 with the first team competing in intra-club matches until 1876, the South Australian National Football League from 1877–1996 and the Australian Football League since 1997.

Individual records

Games

Goalkicking

Games coached

Premierships 
As Player
 SANFL – 9 – Geof Motley (1954–1959, 1962–1963, 1965)
 AFL – 1 – 2004 premiership team

As coach
 SANFL – 10 – John Cahill (1977, 1979–81, 1988–90, 1994–96)
 AFL – 1 – Mark Williams (2004)

Most goals in a match 
 AFL – 8 – Warren Tredrea and Jay Schulz (1998, round 7, vs Carlton, Princes Park; 2014, round 14, vs Western Bulldogs, Adelaide Oval)
 SANFL – 16 – Tim Evans (1980, round 5, vs West Adelaide)

Most goals in a season 
 AFL – 81 – Warren Tredrea (2004)
 SANFL – 153 – Scott Hodges (1990)

Game records

Biggest wins 

 AFL – 117 points vs Hawthorn, round 13, 2005, Football Park

Biggest losses

Highest score 

 AFL – 29.14 (188) vs Hawthorn, round 13, 2005, Football Park

Lowest score 

 AFL – 3.3 (21) vs Collingwood, round 20, 2011, Football Park

Season records

Most season wins 

 AFL – 20 wins (2004)
 SANFL – 21 wins (1980, 1989)

Fewest season losses 

 AFL – 4 losses (2020)
 SAFL – 0 losses (1914)

Streaks

Longest undefeated streaks 

 AFL – 8 wins (round 8 → 15, 2002, round 15 → 22, 2003, round 4 → 12, 2014)

Longest winless streak

Attendances

Largest attendances

Largest home attendances (minor round) 

 AFL – 53,698 at Adelaide Oval (round 3, 2017 vs Adelaide)
 AFL (excluding Showdown) – 52,505 at Adelaide Oval (round 22, 2014 vs )
 SANFL – 38,213 at Football Park (round 19, 1988 vs Sturt), although a double-header (curtain-raiser to Central Districts v North Adelaide game); 37,292 at Adelaide Oval (round 1, 1958 vs Norwood)
 SANFL (suburban) – 22,738 at Alberton Oval (round 11, 1977 vs Norwood)

Largest away attendances (minor round) 

 AFL – 51,883 at MCG (round 1, 1997 vs Collingwood)
 SANFL – 30,618 at Adelaide Oval (round 2, 1965 vs South Adelaide), although counted as a neutral venue (Anzac Day Holiday); 27,728 at Adelaide Oval (round 7, 1964 vs South Adelaide), counted as an away game
 SANFL (suburban) – 22,015 at Unley Oval (round 9, 1968 vs Sturt)

Win–loss record 

Overall win–loss record
  – 548 matches / 286 wins / 257 losses / 5 draws (52.65%)
 SANFL – 2675 matches / 1744 wins / 882 losses / 65 draws (66.02%)

Best league record against another club
Minimum 20 league matches against a current club:
 AFL – St Kilda – 20 wins / 11 losses / 0 draws (64.52%)
 SANFL – Glenelg – 180 wins / 69 losses / 3 draws (72.02%)

Worst league record against another club

Minimum 20 league matches against a current club:
 AFL – Geelong – 11 wins / 23 losses / 1 draw (32.86%)
 SANFL – Norwood – 198 wins / 196 losses / 17 draws (50.24%)

AFL

Notes

References

Port Adelaide Football Club